The Flat Foot Four is a Barbershop quartet that won the 1940 SPEBSQSA international competition. The victorious line-up was the following:

 Johnny Whalen, tenor
 Britt Stegall, lead
 Sam Barnes, bass
 Red Elliott, baritone

References

External links
 AIC entry (archived)

Barbershop quartets
Barbershop Harmony Society